The Revenant Juke: A Collection of Fables and Farce is a box set by the American rock band Primus, released in 2022 in collaboration with Third Man Records. It was distributed exclusively through the Third Man Vault Program subscription service.

Background and contents 

The box set consists of six 7" vinyl records; each contains two tracks and corresponds to one of Primus' first six studio albums. Original sleeve artwork for each record in the set was drawn by Adam Gates, who has also done previous work with the band.

Track listing

Disc One

Disc Two

Disc Three

Disc Four

Disc Five

Disc Six

References 

2022 compilation albums
Primus (band) albums